Teodor Żychliński (25 June 1830, Grzymisław – 26 August 1909, Poznań) was a Polish heraldic, diarist and journalist, editor of "Dziennik Poznański" (1864-1870) and "Kurier Poznański" (1872-1876), author of 31-volumed "Złota księga szlachty polskiej" (Golden Book of Polish Nobility) and memoirs from January Uprising.

In 1861 he married Joanna Tekla Kietz (1836-1913).

References

External links 
 
 Złota księga szlachty polskiej in Wielkopolska Biblioteka Cyfrowa (Vol. 1-7)
 Złota księga szlachty polskiej in Biblioteka Cyfrowa Uniwersytetu Warszawskiego (Vol. 8-31)

19th-century Polish historians
Polish male non-fiction writers
Polish diarists
1830 births
1909 deaths
19th-century diarists